Luke Joins the Navy is a 1916 American short comedy film starring Harold Lloyd. A print of the film survives in the film archive of the Museum of Modern Art.

Cast
 Harold Lloyd as Lonesome Luke
 Snub Pollard
 Bebe Daniels
 Charles Stevenson - (as Charles E. Stevenson)
 Billy Fay
 Fred C. Newmeyer
 Sammy Brooks
 Harry Todd
 Bud Jamison
 Margaret Joslin - (as Mrs. Harry Todd)
 Dee Lampton
 May Cloy

See also
 Harold Lloyd filmography

References

External links

 Luke Joins the Navy on YouTube

1916 films
1916 comedy films
Silent American comedy films
American black-and-white films
Films directed by Hal Roach
Lonesome Luke films
1916 short films
American silent short films
American comedy short films
1910s American films